Cloned is a 1997 American made-for-television action-drama science fiction film starring Elizabeth Perkins, Bradley Whitford, Scott Paulin, Enrico Colantoni, Tina Lifford and Alan Rosenberg. It was directed by Douglas Barr.

Plot
A woman will receive a clone of her dead son if she keeps a geneticist's unethical methods secret.

Cast
 Elizabeth Perkins as Skye Weston
 Bradley Whitford as Rick Weston
 Scott Paulin as John Gryce
 Enrico Colantoni as Steve Rinker
 Tina Lifford as Claire Barnes
 Alan Rosenberg as	Dr. Wesley Kozak

Reception

References

External links
 
 
 Cloned at Moviefone
 Cloned at Movie Web
 Cloned at TCM

1997 films
1990s action drama films
1997 science fiction films
American action drama films
American science fiction films
NBC network original films
Films scored by Mark Snow
1997 drama films
American drama television films
Films about cloning
1990s English-language films
Films directed by Douglas Barr
1990s American films